The Fischer was a brass era automobile manufactured in Detroit, Michigan by the G.J. Fischer Company in 1914.  It was a light car (rather than a cyclecar), built as a two- or four-seater model, including a sedan.  It had a Perkins four-cylinder water-cooled 1.2L engine.  It had a selective transmission and shaft drive.  The two-seater cost $525, and the sedan cost $845. The Fischer brothers, all 7 of them lived in Flint, Michigan.

References
 

Defunct motor vehicle manufacturers of the United States
Motor vehicle manufacturers based in Michigan
Defunct manufacturing companies based in Michigan